What Happened to Rosa is a 1920 American silent comedy film directed by Victor Schertzinger and featuring Mabel Normand and Doris Pawn.

Plot
A fortune teller tells a store clerk with a romantic disposition that she was a Spanish noblewoman in an earlier life. The girl begins to live the part of the Spanish noblewoman and romance and comedy ensue.

Cast
 Mabel Normand as Mayme Ladd / Rosa Alvaro
 Doris Pawn as Gwen Applebaum
 Tully Marshall as Percy Peacock
 Hugh Thompson as Dr. Maynard Drew
 Eugenie Besserer as Madame Yvette O'Donnell
 Buster Trow as Jim
 Adolphe Menjou as Reporter Friend of Dr. Drew (uncredited)

See also
 List of American films of 1920

References

External links
 
 What Happened to Rosa at Looking for Mabel Normand

1920 films
1920 comedy films
Silent American comedy films
American black-and-white films
Films directed by Victor Schertzinger
1920s American films